City of Stars is a song performed by Ryan Gosling and Emma Stone in the 2016 film La La Land.

City of Stars may also refer to:

 "City of Stars", a song by Logic from his 2015 album The Incredible True Story
 City of Stars, a colloquial term used to describe Brisbane, California